The Shootist is a 1976 American Western film directed by Don Siegel and based on Glendon Swarthout's 1975 novel of the same name. It was John Wayne's final film role, before his death in 1979. The screenplay was written by Miles Hood Swarthout (the son of the author) and Scott Hale. The supporting cast includes Lauren Bacall, Ron Howard, James Stewart, Richard Boone, Hugh O'Brian, Harry Morgan, John Carradine, Sheree North, Scatman Crothers, and Rick Lenz.

In 1977, The Shootist received an Oscar nomination for Best Art Direction (Robert F. Boyle, Arthur Jeph Parker), a BAFTA Film Award nomination for Best Actress (Lauren Bacall), and a Golden Globe Award nomination for Best Supporting Actor (Ron Howard), as well as the National Board of Review Award as one of the Top Ten Films of 1976. The film received widespread critical acclaim, garnering an 83% positive rating on Rotten Tomatoes.

Plot
The opening scenes are a narrated flashback of the thirty plus killings by sheriff-turned-gunfighter John Bernard "J.B." Books, using actual scenes from John Wayne's past films.

Now an older man, Books arrives in Carson City, Nevada, in late January 1901. Almost immediately, just outside town, he gets into a dangerous confrontation with an armed robber. Books disarms the robber quickly, by wounding him. Then in Carson City, he has another confrontation with dairyman Jay Cobb, but Cobb's assistant, Gillom Rogers, verbally defuses the situation. Books then goes to Dr. E.W. "Doc" Hostetler, a Carson City physician who already knows Books, from treating his gunshot wounds fifteen years before. Books came to seek out Dr. Hostetler for a second opinion concerning his failing health. Hostetler confirms that Books has terminal cancer and has only a few months to live. Books is prescribed laudanum to ease his pain, but learns that his condition will eventually become painful and unbearable. Hostetler remarks that if he had Books's courage, the death he has just described from cancer is not the one he would choose.

Needing a place to live, Books finds lodgings at a quiet Carson City boarding house owned by Bond Rogers, Gillom's widowed mother. Wanting to be left alone, Books gives her a fake name. However, Gillom, Rogers son,  finds Books' name at the local stable with stable owner Moses. Book's name is on Book's horse's saddle, and he quickly deduces Books true identity. Gillom soon runs home, and tells his mom Bond that Books is actually a renowned and famous gunfighter. Bond is very upset that Books has lied to her about who he is, and summons Marshal Walter Thibido; Books gets rid of Thibido by explaining his circumstances, and assuring the marshal that he'll likely be dead soon. Now more sympathetic to his plight, Bond asks Books to accompany her to church to obtain solace and comfort. However, Books maintains he has no need of repentance, stating that he has never harmed or injured anyone who did not deserve it.

Word spreads that Books is in town, causing him trouble from those seeking to profit off his name, or to kill him. A local journalist, Dan Dobkins, gets chased off when he asks Books for an interview. Serepta, an old flame of Books's, shows up; she eventually leaves after admitting that Dobkins approached her about writing a "biography" of Books' life filled with exaggerated stories of his gunfights. Books orders a headstone, but rejects the undertaker's offer of a free funeral, suspecting he would charge the public admission to view his remains. Two criminals seeking notoriety try to ambush Books as he sleeps, but he kills them. Gillom is impressed, but his mother is both angry at and frightened for Books, though she will not admit it. She also grows concerned that the fatherless Gillom will try to follow in his footsteps as the two grow closer, with Books teaching Gillom how to shoot properly.

Books asks Gillom to visit three men with violent reputations: Mike Sweeney, an aging outlaw and the brother of a man Books once killed in self-defense; Jack Pulford, the Faro dealer at the local Metropole saloon, known to be a deadly crack shot; and Cobb, Gillom's boss. Gillom is to tell each of the three men that Books will be at the Metropole at 11:00 am on January 29, his birthday. On the morning of January 29, the headstone arrives, which includes Books' death year as "1901", but with no day. Books gives Gillom his beloved horse, bids farewell to Bond, and then boards a trolley for the Carson City saloon.

Books enters the saloon to find the three men waiting for him at different tables. Books orders a drink, toasting his birthday and his three "guests". Cobb, Sweeney, and Pulford then each try to kill Books, but despite getting wounded in the arm, he manages to kill them. A crowd fills the street outside the Metropole after hearing the gunshots, including Gillom, who eventually enters the bar. His shouted warning is too late, and the Metropole's bartender fires his shotgun into Books' back, mortally wounding him. Gillom rushes over, takes up Books' gun, and kills the bartender. When Gillom realizes what he has done and throws the gun away, Books smiles in approval before dying. Gillom covers the body with his coat and walks outside to his waiting mother. He walks past her, and she turns and follows him.

Cast

Production
After producer Mike Frankovich announced that he had purchased the movie rights to Glendon Swarthout's novel The Shootist, Wayne expressed a strong desire to play the title role, reportedly because of similarities to the character Jimmy Ringo in The Gunfighter, a role he had turned down 25 years previously.  He was not initially considered due to the health and stamina issues he had experienced during filming of his penultimate film, Rooster Cogburn. Paul Newman passed on the role, as did George C. Scott, Charles Bronson, Gene Hackman, and Clint Eastwood, before it was finally offered to Wayne.  Although his compromised lung capacity made breathing and mobility difficult at Carson City's  altitude, and production had to be shut down for a week while he recovered from influenza, Wayne completed the filming without further significant medical issues.

The Shootist was Wayne's final cinematic role, concluding a 50-year career that began during the silent film era in 1926. Wayne was not, as sometimes reported, terminally ill when the film was made in 1976. A heavy cigarette smoker for most of his life, he had been diagnosed with lung cancer in 1964 and underwent surgical removal of his left lung and several ribs. He remained clinically cancer-free until early 1979, when metastases were discovered in his stomach, intestines, and spine; he died in June of that year. Nonetheless, following the release of The Shootist, Wayne appeared in a televised public service announcement for the American Cancer Society that began with the scene in which Wayne's character is informed of his cancer. Wayne then added that he had enacted the same scene in real life 12 years earlier.

The date assigned to the first John Wayne clip at the opening of the film corresponds to its actual filming in relation to The Shootist. The Shootist was shot in 1976 while Red River was shot in 1946 (albeit released in 1948), putting the two movies thirty years apart. The onscreen dates were also thirty years apart, 1871 for the Red River clip and 1901 for the time frame of The Shootist itself. The other films used for clips were Hondo dated 1880, Rio Bravo dated 1885, and two clips from El Dorado dated 1889 and 1895.

The film's outdoor scenes were filmed on location in Carson City. Bond Rogers' boarding house is the 1914 Krebs-Peterson House, located in Carson City's historic residential district. The buggy ride was shot at Washoe Lake State Park, in the Washoe Valley, between Reno and Carson City. Though it was a Paramount production, the street scenes and most interior shots were filmed at the Warner Bros. backlot and sound stages in Burbank, California.  The horse-drawn trolley was an authentic one, once used as a shuttle between El Paso and Juarez, Mexico.

Wayne's contract gave him script approval, and he made a number of major and minor changes, including the location (from El Paso to Carson City), and the ending. In the book and original screenplay, Books kills his last opponent by shooting him in the back, is fatally wounded by a bartender with a shotgun, and is finally put out of his misery by Gillom; Wayne maintained that over his entire film career, he had never shot an adversary in the back and would not do so now. He also objected to his character being killed by Gillom and suggested that the bartender do it, because "no one could ever take John Wayne in a fair fight". 
 
Wayne was also responsible for many casting decisions. Several friends and past co-stars, including Bacall, Stewart, Boone, and Carradine, were cast at his request. James Stewart had not worked in films for a number of years, due in part to a severe hearing impairment, but he accepted the role as a favor to Wayne. Stewart and Wayne had both worked in two previous films, also Westerns, The Man Who Shot Liberty Valance and How the West Was Won, both released in 1962, although they shared no scenes together in the latter film.

While filming the sequence in the doctor's office, both Stewart and Wayne repeatedly muffed their lines over a long series of takes, until director Don Siegel finally pleaded with them to try harder. "If you want the scene done better," joked Wayne, "you'd better get yourself a couple of better actors." Later, Wayne commented in private that Stewart knew his lines, but apparently could not hear his cues.

Another casting stipulation was the horse owned and given away by Wayne's character, a favorite sorrel gelding named Dollor that Wayne had ridden in Big Jake, The Cowboys, True Grit, Rooster Cogburn, Chisum, and The Train Robbers.  Wayne had negotiated exclusive movie rights to Dollor with the horse's owner, Dick Webb Movie Productions, and requested script changes enabling him to mention Dollor's name several times.

By one account, Wayne's numerous directorial suggestions and script alterations caused considerable friction between director and star, but Siegel said that he and Wayne got along well.
He had plenty of his own ideas ... some I liked, which gave me inspirations, and some I didn't like. But we didn't fight over any of it.  We liked each other and respected each other.

Reception

Box office
Upon its theatrical release, The Shootist was a minor success, grossing $13,406,138 domestically, About $6 million were earned as US theatrical rentals.

Critical
It was named one of the Ten Best Films of 1976 by the National Board of Review, along with Rocky, All the President's Men, and Network. Film critic Roger Ebert of the Chicago Sun-Times ranked The Shootist number 10 on his list of the 10 best films of 1976. The film was nominated for an Oscar, a Golden Globe, a BAFTA film award, and a Writers Guild of America award. The film has an 83% rating on the review aggregator website Rotten Tomatoes, based on 24 reviews.  The film was nominated by the American Film Institute as one of the best Western films in 2008.

Quentin Tarantino later wrote,
There’s nothing in The Shootist you haven’t seen done many times before and done better … but what you haven’t seen before is a dying John Wayne give his last performance. And it’s Wayne’s performance, and the performances of some of the surrounding characters (Howard, Richard Boone, Harry Morgan, and Sheree North) that make The Shootist not the classic it wants to be, but memorable nonetheless.

Awards nominations

 Novel
 Western Writers of America, Spur Award winner - "Best Western Novel" - 1975 (as: "one of the best western novels ever written." and as: "one of the 10 greatest Western novels written in the 20th century.")

Also in 2008, the American Film Institute nominated this film for its Top 10 Western Films list.

See also
 John Wayne filmography

References

External links
 
 
 
 The Shootist at Rotten Tomatoes
 Glendon Swarthout website

1976 films
1976 Western (genre) films
American Western (genre) films
Films scored by Elmer Bernstein
Films about old age
Films based on American novels
Films based on Western (genre) novels
Films directed by Don Siegel
Films shot in Nevada
Films set in Nevada
Films set in 1901
Paramount Pictures films
Films produced by Dino De Laurentiis
1970s English-language films
1970s American films